Hillestad kirke is a church from 1724 in Holmestrand municipality, Vestfold og Telemark county. The building is made of wood, and has 150 seats. The church's graveyard is registered with DIS-Norge.

External links 
 Hillestad church Church search
 Hillestad Kirke at vf.DISNorge.no
 Brochure at www.Kirken.no/Tunsberg (2 page .pdf file).

Churches in Vestfold og Telemark
Religious buildings and structures completed in 1724
1724 in Norway
Holmestrand